Mwense is a constituency of the National Assembly of Zambia. It covers part of Mwense and a rural area to the north of the town in Mwense District of Luapula Province.

List of MPs

References

Constituencies of the National Assembly of Zambia
1968 establishments in Zambia
Constituencies established in 1968